Park Presidio Boulevard is a road and park in San Francisco, California which connects Golden Gate Park to the Presidio of San Francisco. It carries California State Route 1 along its entire route.

The land was purchased in 1903, for the sum of $360,000, as an extension of Golden Gate Park.

Running from Crossover Drive near the John F. Kennedy Drive overpass inside Golden Gate Park westward, it turns north and runs between 14th Avenue and Funston Avenue in the Richmond District. Here, the tree-lined boulevard acts as a noise barrier for the adjacent streets; a gravel trail also runs on the east side of the road. At the northern terminus at Lake Street, the road continues into the Presidio as Veteran's Boulevard.

References

External links
 Park Presidio Boulevard at San Francisco Recreation & Parks
1964 plans for the conversion of Park Presidio Boulevard to freeway

Streets in San Francisco
Parks in San Francisco
Golden Gate Park
Presidio of San Francisco
California State Route 1